Class 120 may refer to:

DB Baureihe 120. A class of electric locomotives operated by DB Fernverkehr in Germany.
British Rail Class 120. A type of Diesel railcar built by Swindon Works for British Rail.